The Kochi-Muziris Biennale is an international exhibition of contemporary art held in the city of Kochi in Kerala, India. It is the largest art exhibition in the country and the biggest contemporary art festival in Asia. The Kochi-Muziris Biennale is an initiative of the Kochi Biennale Foundation with support from the Government of Kerala. The concept of Kochi-Muziris Biennale was ideated and executed by Dr. Venu Vasudevan IAS, who was the culture Secretary, Government of Kerala. The exhibition is set in spaces across Kochi, with shows being held in existing galleries, halls, and site-specific installations in public spaces, heritage buildings and disused structures.

Indian and international artists exhibit artworks across a variety of mediums including film, installation, painting, sculpture, new media and performance art. Through the celebration of contemporary art from around the world, the Kochi-Muziris Biennale seeks to invoke the historic cosmopolitan legacy of the modern metropolis of Kochi, and its mythical predecessor, the ancient port of Muziris.

Alongside the exhibition, the Biennale offers a rich programme of talks, seminars, screenings, music, workshops and educational activities for school children and students.

The Birth of Kochi-Muziris Biennale 
In May 2010, Mumbai based contemporary artists of Kerala origin, Bose Krishnamachari and Riyas Komu, were approached by then culture minister of Kerala, M. A. Baby to start an international art project in the state. Acknowledging the lack of an international platform for contemporary art in India, Bose and Riyas proposed the idea of a Biennale (a large scale international exhibition) in Kochi on the lines of the Venice Biennale.

Kochi Biennale Foundation 
The Kochi Biennale Foundation (KBF) is a non-profit charitable trust engaged in promoting art & culture and educational activities in India; primary amongst them the hosting of the Kochi-Muziris Biennale. KBF works around the year to strengthen contemporary art infrastructure and to broaden public access to art across India.

The Kochi Biennale Foundation is also engaged in the conservation of heritage properties and monuments and the upliftment of traditional forms of art and culture.

KBF was founded in 2010 by artists Bose Krishnamachari and Riyas Komu .

The First Kochi-Muziris Biennale  

The First Kochi-Muziris Biennale began on 12 December 2012. The Biennale hosted 80 artists with nearly 50 percent foreign artists, site-specific works and a sustained education programme in the three months. As a run-up to the event, in April, the Durbar Hall Kochi will host German modern artist Eberhard Havekost's exhibition "Sightseeing Trip", held in collaboration with Dresden State Art Collections. The Aspinwall House exhibits the art works of 44 artists spread across the premises.

Entry was free till 23 December which was then replaced by ticketed entry at ₹50 to help pay for daily running costs. According to artist and Kochi-Muziris Biennale artistic director Bose Krishnamachari support has come in many forms. Shalini and Sanjay Passi held a INR 25,000-per-head dinner in the capital to raise funds, raising . Google met with the foundation and has offered help with the website, which received 7.5 million hits in the first month. The Jindals of Jindal Steel and Power Limited, the late Kerala Congress leader T.M. Jacob, R.K. Krishna Kumar of Tata group, Jayanta Matthews of Malayala Manorama and the businessman Shibu Mathai have all donated.

The sites for the Kochi-Muziris Biennale were: 

 Aspinwall House
 David Hall
 Pepper House
 Moidu's Heritage
 Durbar Hall
 Cabral Yard
 Parade Ground
 Fort Kochi beach
 Kashi Art Gallery
 Jew Town Road Godown
 Rose Street Bungalow
 Cochin Club
 Gallery OED https://www.thehindu.com/features/friday-review/art/a-brush-with-new-colours/article5192998.ece
 David Horvitz

The Second Kochi-Muziris Biennale 
The second edition of the biennale cost about ₹17 crore, slightly up from the ₹16.5 crore spent on the first edition. The Kerala government's contribution fell to ₹3 crore from ₹9 crore despite pleas for financial assistance. The organisers relied on sponsorship and online crowd funding for meeting the expenses. The number of visitors grew to five lakhs in the second edition, an increase of one lakh from the first edition.

First Urban Space Dialogue in Kochi
In March 2015, the Kochi Muziris Biennale Foundation partnered with Center for Public Policy Research, Cochin for the first Urban Space Dialogue in Kochi to advocate for the need for creating urban spaces in Kochi. The Dialogue featured Nuru Karim of Nu.De; Raj Cherubal of Chennai City Connect Foundation and advisor to CPPR; Dr Dhanuraj, chairman, CPPR; Jitish Kallat, curator of biennale 2014–15; Bose Krishnamachary and Riyas Komu founders of the Biennale.

The Third Kochi-Muziris Biennale 
The third edition of the Kochi Muziris Biennale opened on 12 December 2016 and was curated by Sudarshan Shetty.  The Biennale was visited by more than six lakh people in its third edition. The exhibition was concurrently staged at 12 venues and featured 97 works as well as 20 events. Sudarshan was declared curator of the 2016 Kochi-Muzirs Biennale by the Minister for Culture, K. C. Joseph at an event in the State capital Thiruvananthapuram on 15 July 2015. He was unanimously chosen as curator by an Artistic Advisory Committee appointed by the Kochi Biennale Foundation for the third edition. The Committee comprised artists Amar Kanwar, Atul Dodiya, Bharti Kher and Jyothi Basu, art critic Ranjit Hoskote, patron Kiran Nadar, gallerist Shireen Gandhy along with KBF trustees Sunil V, Riyas Komu and Bose Krishnamachari. 

Sudarshan Shetty was born in Mangalore in 1961, with his family moving to Bombay within a few months of his birth. He has since been based in Bombay. His works have been exhibited in solo and group shows in India and abroad, including at the Gwangju Biennale (2000), Tate Modern, London (2001), Fukuoka Asian Art Museum (2001), Centre Pompidou, Paris (2011), Guggenheim Museum, New York (2010), and Kochi-Muziris Biennale (2012).

The list of artists at the 2016 KMB can be found on the Kochi Muziris Biennale website.

The Fourth Kochi-Muziris Biennale

 
The fourth edition of Kochi-Muziris Biennale opened on 12 December 2018 and was curated by Indian artist Anita Dube.

The Fifth Kochi-Muziris Biennale 
In May 2019, it was announced that Singaporean artist and writer, Shubigi Rao would curate the fifth edition of the Kochi-Muziris Biennale from December 2020 to April 2021. Rao had previously exhibited at the fourth Kochi-Muziris Biennale in 2018, the sole Singaporean representative. Titled "In our Veins Flow Ink and Fire", the first announced artist list involved 25 participating artists and collectives, featuring names such as Arpita Singh, Decolonizing Architecture Art Residency, Iman Issa, Joan Jonas, Melati Suryodarmo, Samson Young, Slavs and Tatars, Thảo Nguyên Phan, and Yinka Shonibare.

Both Kochi-Muziris Biennale founder Bose Krishnamachari and Shubigi Rao would be jointly featured on the 2019 edition of the ArtReview Power 100 list for their work on the Biennale.

“In Our Veins Flow Ink and Fire” finally opened on December 23, 2022 after being postponed twice due to Covid-19 and then again the night before the opening on the 11th of December 2022 due to “organisational challenges.” 53 Artists signed an open letter to the Biennale Foundation detailing the organisational shortcomings and exhorting the Board and Advisors to make structural changes in future editions.

Reactions and Controversies
According to Tate Modern, Kochi-Muziris Biennale was the best biennale they had ever seen. The biennale accrued 150,000 visitors in its first month and 250,000 visitors in its second, averaging a thousand visitors a day (as high as 5,000 daily and 10,000 on weekends, early January). Local people have stepped up, on an individual level, realising what the biennale has done for them, socio-economically and culturally, and in terms of putting Kochi on the international culture map. McKinsey and companies have expressed their interest in studying the Biennale to know its economic effects.

According to Karthyayani G. Menon, director of Jehangir Art Gallery in Mumbai, Kerala – unlike Mumbai, Baroda or Kolkata had not been in the forefront in encouraging artists and giving them good platforms but now she hoped that the biennale would mark a change to that situation.

Many eminent artists in Kerala raised concern over the alleged lack of transparency in the way the funds were spent by Kochi-Muziris Biennale foundation. At the same time many known contemporary artists of the state of Kerala had come out in support of the event as it could help in enhancing the image of Kochi.

With the 2016 demonetization of the Indian economy, several artists and the organizers of the Biennale had to overcome a struggle to get things in place for the opening of the exhibition. However, the Biennale received a boost when at the official opening, the government of Kerala promised $1.1M funding and support for a permanent venue to cement its place as the Venice Biennale of South Asia. Chief Minister Pinarayi Vijayan, who is the leader of the Left Democratic Front government and long-time secretary of the Communist Party of India (Marxist) in the state, said the Biennale matched Kochi's multi-layered history of settlement by Arabs, Chinese, Jews, Portuguese, Dutch, English and different migrant communities from India. Vijayan announced ₹7.5 crore in funding for the Biennale, the highest sum a state government in India had ever given an art event. The government would support a permanent venue for the "mega-prestigious" event that had been the key to the success of the Kochi Muziris Biennale, he said.

The fifth edition of the Biennale was mismanaged by the organisers leading to a last-minute postponement which led to stranded visitors who had travelled from all the way across the globe. The Biennale has also faced accusations of modern slavery, including non-payment of wages, and non-attribution of workers' contributions to artworks.

Gallery from past editions

References

External links
 
 
 https://www.thehindubusinessline.com/news/variety/no-plans-of-postponing-the-kochi-muziris-biennale-at-the-moment-bose-krishnamachari/article31268689.ece

Further reading 
 
 Rachel A. Varghese, 2017. "Past as a Metaphor in the New Utopian Imaginations of Heritage in Kerala", in Tereza Kuldova and Mathew A Varghese (Eds.). Urban Utopias: Excess and Expulsion in Neoliberal South Asia, New York: Palgrave Macmillan. pp. 169–180..

 
Art exhibitions in India
Art biennials
2012 establishments in Kerala
Culture of Kochi
History of Kerala (1947–present)